Saussey may refer to the following communes in France:

Saussey, Côte-d'Or, in the Côte-d'Or département 
Saussey, Manche, in the Manche département

See also

Saussay (disambiguation)
La Saussaye, in the Eure département